Erik Tallig (born 10 January 2000) is a German professional footballer who plays as a midfielder for 1860 Munich.

References

2000 births
Living people
Sportspeople from Chemnitz
German footballers
Footballers from Saxony
Association football midfielders
Chemnitzer FC players
TSV 1860 Munich players
3. Liga players